To Be or Not to Be is a 1983 American war comedy film directed by Alan Johnson, produced by Mel Brooks, and starring Brooks, Anne Bancroft, Tim Matheson, Charles Durning, Christopher Lloyd, and José Ferrer. The screenplay was written by Ronny Graham and Thomas Meehan, based on the original story by Melchior Lengyel, Ernst Lubitsch and Edwin Justus Mayer. The film is a remake of the 1942 film of the same name.

Plot
Fredrick Bronski runs a large ensemble show out of Warsaw. Despite the relative success the show receives, the majority of the cast are annoyed by the fact that Fredrick nitpicks who does what, in particular his wife Anna, whom he regularly tries to undermine despite her getting the lion's share of praise. This leads her to begin an affair with RAF pilot Andre Sobinski behind Fredrick's back, but the fling is cut short by the Nazi invasion of Poland forcing Sobinski to return to England.

As the Bronski Theater struggles to remain open in spite of Gestapo censorship, Sobinski and the rest of the RAF's Polish squadron commiserate with Polish radio freedom fighter Dr. Siletski, leading to him acquiring messages to people in the Polish Underground when he says he intends to return to Poland to lead the fight there. However, when Siletski fails to recognize Anna Bronski's name despite having claimed to have lived in Warsaw, Sobinski and his superiors realize that Siletski is a Nazi sympathizer who intends to sells the names to Gestapo leader Erhardt. Sobinski air drops into Warsaw and meets up with Anna and Fredrick, who have been forced to move in with Anna's personal hairdresser Sasha after their home was turned into Gestapo Headquarters.

Knowing that Siletski and Erhardt have never met in person, Fredrick uses a dinner date Siletski forced on Anna to pose as Erhardt. He successfully retrieves the list from Siletski, but unwittingly blows his cover when he reveals Anna's affair with Sobinski. Siletski tries to escape in the confusion but Sobinski shoots him down, forcing Fredrick to pose as Siletski to not only get Anna out of SS custody, but fool the real Erhardt when he comes calling. He manages to lead him in the wrong direction of the Polish Underground, but when his cover's nearly blown when he attempts to rescue Sasha, who was poised to be sent to a concentration camp for being homosexual, the theatre troupe manage a quick rescue.

Knowing the ruse won't be able to hold for much longer, Sobinski and the Bronski Theater plan to use a special show viewed by Hitler as a smokescreen to get themselves (and the sheer number of Jewish refugees Fredrick unwillingly sheltered) out of Occupied Poland. Despite hiccups in the performance and Hitler's airport security catching on to the deception, the group escapes and makes it to England. In gratitude for their heroics, the English government allows the Bronskis to perform in London, where Anna, to Fredrick and Sobinski's horror, begins yet another affair with a soldier.

Cast

Connections with the original
This remake is mostly faithful to the 1942 film on which it is based and, in many cases, dialogue is taken verbatim from the earlier film. The characters of Bronski and Joseph Tura are, however, combined into a single character (played by Brooks). The character of the treacherous Professor Siletsky (here spelled Siletski) is made into a more comic, even somewhat buffoonish, figure; in the original he was the only completely serious character. Instead of having the company preparing for Hamlet, Bronski performs his "world famous, in Poland" highlights from Hamlet, including the To Be or Not To Be soliloquy, from which the film's name is taken. His dresser, Anna, has been replaced with Sasha, allowing them to address the plight of gay people under the Nazis, as well as the Jews.

Reception
Roger Ebert's three-star review stated that in the film, Mel Brooks "combines a backstage musical with a wartime romance and comes up with an eclectic comedy that races off into several directions, usually successfully." Gene Siskel awarded two-and-half stars and wrote that the film "contains more genuine sentiment than big laughs. If you are looking for laughs, as I was the first time I saw it, you may be disappointed. More often than not the jokes just lay there, a beat late, easily anticipated. On a second viewing, however, the sentiment of the piece rings true, particularly the troupe's final theatrical confrontation with an all-Nazi audience." (On their annual If We Picked the Winners Oscar special the next year, both Siskel & Ebert chose Charles Durning's Oscar nomination as the worst nomination of that year, believing that he took a slot that could've gone to any of the cast members of The Right Stuff or to Jeff Daniels for his performance in Terms of Endearment.)

Vincent Canby of The New York Times lauded the film as "smashingly funny. I'm not at all sure that it's a classic, but it's so good in its own right, in the way it preserves and revives the wonderfully farcical Edwin Justus Mayer screenplay, that you leave the theater having a brand-new high." Variety called it "very funny stuff indeed," adding, "Durning is a standout as the buffoonish Gestapo topper and Bancroft's pseudo-seduction of him, and Ferrer, are among the pic's highlights." Kevin Thomas of the Los Angeles Times thought that the film didn't work "on two formidable counts. First, Brooks and his associates could never be accused of having anything remotely resembling a Lubitsch touch: that celebrated, indefinable combination of wit, subtlety and sophistication that allowed the legendary Berlin-born director to get away with implying just about anything, although even he was accused of bad taste in making his 'To Be Or Not To Be.' Second, we know far more than was known in 1942 of the full extent of the Nazi evil, especially in regard to the fate of the Jews ... Somehow an entire movie that depicts the Nazis as the buffoons of fantasy, while we know full well that the peril of Brooks' largely Jewish acting company is all too real, isn't very funny but instead is merely crass." Gary Arnold of The Washington Post wrote that "Brooks embarks on an unnecessary remake and then fails to tailor the material adequately to a 1980s perspective or his own performing strengths ... the result is a klunky, tacky-looking color reproduction of the original." David Ansen of Newsweek stated, "To those who know and love the Jack Benny-Carole Lombard original, this may seem like sacrilege. But because the copy is so entertaining in its own right, it seems more a tribute than a rip-off ... Do not expect the usual Brooksian ka-ka jokes and mad non sequiturs: this is his warmest, most plotbound and traditional movie. It may be a twice-told tale, but it's nice to know that delight can strike twice in the same spot."

It has a 60% rating on Rotten Tomatoes based on 20 reviews, indicating "Fresh."

However, the film was not a great commercial success, grossing only $13,030,214.

Awards and nominations

References

External links

 
 
 
 
 
 

1983 films
American satirical films
American screwball comedy films
1980s English-language films
Remakes of American films
Films about actors
Films about theatre
American slapstick comedy films
American World War II films
Films scored by John Morris
Films produced by Mel Brooks
Brooksfilms films
20th Century Fox films
Films directed by Alan Johnson (choreographer)
Films with screenplays by Thomas Meehan (writer)
1980s Polish-language films
1980s screwball comedy films
1983 comedy films
1983 multilingual films
Polish multilingual films
1983 directorial debut films
1980s American films